The  Engineering College Jhalawar, Rajasthan was established in 2007 in the Jhalawar district of Rajasthan, India.

The  Engineering College Jhalawar is affiliated to the Rajasthan Technical University Kota and the courses are duly approved by AICTE New-Delhi.

The college  is spread in more than 45 acres. There is facilities of sports and library.

Departments 

The academic departments in GECJ include the following:
 Chemistry
 Physics
 Mathematics
 Civil Engineering
 Mechanical Engineering
 Computer Science & Engineering
 Electronics and Communication Engineering
 Information Technology
 Electrical Engineering
 BBA
 BCA
 MBA

Faculty
 Faculty Data
Department of Computer Science & Engineering 

Regular Faculty

Pt. Yogesh Sharma (HOD CSE)

Dr. Ashwini Sharma (Assistant Professor)

Sh. Sachinpal Singh Yadav ( UGC-NET June 2012 Qualified | Assistant Professor & HOD BCA)

Sh. Ramprasad Jat (Assistant Professor)

NPIU (TEQIP-III) Faculty

Mr. Katkar Atish Rajebhau [ M.Tech (NIT Goa) | Assistant Professor ]

Mr. MVR PURNA KUMAR  [ M.Tech (NIT Trichy), |UGC-NET Qualified Assistant Professor ]

Dr. Shashi Kant Rathore [ Ph.D, M.Tech(MNIT Jaipur) | Assistant Professor]

Mr. Shailendra Soni [M.Tech (IIT Jodhpur) | Assistant Professor]

Ms. Reshu Bansal [ M.Tech (IIT-ISM Dhanbad) | Assistant Professor]

Guest Faculty

Mr. Karma Ram Kala [ M S(SPUP Jodhpur) | Assistant Professor]

Ms. Rukhsar Sultana [ M.Tech(CURAJ) | Assistant Professor]

Technical Assistant

Sh. Ashish Kr. Sharma [ MCA | Hardware & Networking]

Department of Mechanical Engineering

Regular Faculty

Mr. Manoj mittal (HOD)

Dr. Moti lal  Rinawa (assistant prof.)

Mr. Mahaveer Meghvanshi (assistant prof.)

Contract Faculty

Mr. Antariksh Gautam [M.Tech | assistant prof.]

Mr. Ravindra prajapati [M.Tech | assistant prof.]

Mr. Ranjan Kumar Singh [M.Tech | assistant prof.]

Mr. Umardaraj [M.Tech | assistant prof.]

Mr. Pradeep Suman [M.Tech | assistant prof.]

NPIU (TEQIP-III) Faculty

Dr. Simon Peter [ ph.d (IITG) | assistant prof. ]

Mr. Ankit [M.Tech( NITKKR) | assistant prof.]

Mr. Dhruv Singh [M.Tech (IITR) | assistant prof.]

Mr. Dibyanshu Pandey [ M.Tech (IITK) | assistant prof.]

Mr. Sachin Singh [M.Tech (IIT Delhi) | Assistant Professor]

Intake

GECJ Campus

Central Library

  Library Introduction
The GECJ Library System consists of a Central Library which support the teaching, research and extension programmes of the Institute. All students, faculty members and employees of the Institute are entitled to make use of the Library facilities on taking library membership. The Library has a collection of books on engineering, science, humanities & as well as various journals, magazines & newspapers are also subscribed.
  Library Computerization
The Library uses Libsys software package which is an integrated multi-user library management system that supports all in-house operations of the Library. The Libsys consists of modules on acquisition, cataloguing, circulation, serials, article indexing and OPAC. Retrospective conversion of bibliographic records is under process & will be available  for access through the Libsys OPAC. The database of books available in the Library is being updated on day-to-day basis with details of recently acquired books. Records of all the Library patrons have also been created in the Libsys package. The editing and updating activities are in progress.
  Bar Code-based Circulation System
The Libsys package has been successfully implemented for the circulation activities. All faculty, staff & student members have been migrated to the new computerized circulation system. The package has also been implemented for Acquisition and Cataloguing activities. The data entry  work for Serials System is in progress.

Internet
The whole campus, including classrooms, student hostels, teaching blocks, academic and administrative buildings, are connected to the Internet.

Hostel
Separate hostel for Boys and Girls with Mess facility.
The boys hostel has capacity of 350 students .
The girls hostel has capacity of 100 students.
Hostel students are free for organising any event in campus.

Book Bank
The Books from the Book Bank are issued for the whole semester and every semester.
The Library has Book Bank facility for all and SC/ST students.

Canteen
 There is one canteen, which is not operational.

Engineering colleges in Rajasthan
Education in Jhalawar district
Educational institutions established in 2007
2007 establishments in Rajasthan